ʻAbdu'l-Hamíd Ishráq-Khávari (1902 – 1972) was a prominent Iranian Baháʼí scholar. He became a Baháʼí in 1927. He was a teacher in one of the Baháʼí schools in Iran, until the schools were closed in 1934. He prepared many compilations of Bahá'í writings, commentaries, apologetic works, and historic studies.

Works
Some of his more important works are as follows:
Abvábu'l-Malakút, a vocalized collection of Arabic Baháʼí prayers. 
Aqdáḥu'l-Faláḥ (volumes 1 and 2), comments on various subjects pertaining to the Abrahamic religions. 
Áthár-i-Qalam-i-Aʻlá, volumes 3 and 4; collections of the writings of Baháʼu'lláh.
Dáʼiratu'l-Maʻárifu'l-Amrí, a Baháʼí Encyclopedia in 16 volumes.
Ganjíniy-i-Ḥudúd va Aḥkám, a collection of writings on Baháʼí laws and ordinances. 
Ganj-i-Sháygán, a chronological survey of Baháʼuʼlláh's writings. 
Jannát-i-Naʻím (volumes 1 and 2), collections of the poems of Naʻím-i-Sidihí, a celebrated Baháʼí poet. 
Máʼidiy-i-Ásmání
 volumes 1, 4, 7, 8 are collections of Bahá'u'lláh's Tablets
 volumes 2, 5, 9 are collections of 'Abdu'l-Bahá's Tablets 
 volumes 3 and 6 are a collection of Shoghi Effendi's letters
Muḥáḍirát (volumes 1, 2, and 3), transcribed oral conversations with Ishráq-Khávarí on various subjects. 
Núrayn-i-Nayyirayn, a biography of the Núrayn-i-Nayyirayn, two early Baháʼí martyrs. 
Payám-i-Malakút, a thematically-arranged compilation of Baháʼí writings. 
Qámús-i-Kitáb-i-Íqán, a commentary on the Kitáb-i-Íqán (Book of Certitude), four volumes.
Qámús-i-Tawqíʻ-i-Maníʻ-i-Naw-Rúz-i-108 Badíʻ, a concordance to Shoghi Effendi's Naw-Rúz 108 BE message (in Persian). 
Raḥíq-i-Makhtúm (volumes 1 and 2), a selection of different subjects in alphabetical order in two volumes. Commentary on Shoghi Effendi's centennial letter Lawḥ-i-Qarn.
Risáliy-i-Ayyám-i-Tisʻih, a collection of Baháʼí writings on the nine Baháʼí Holy Days. 
Risáliy-i-Nuṣús-i-Alváḥ dar báriy-i-Baqáy-i-Arváḥ, a collection of Baháʼí writings on the immortality of the human soul. 
Risáliy-i-Tasbíḥ va Tahlíl, a vocalized collection of Arabic prayers by Baháʼuʼlláh. 
Sharḥ-i-Ḥayát-i-Ḥaḍrat-i-Valíyy-i-Amru'lláh, a brief biography of Shoghi Effendi. 
Taqrírát dar báriy-i-Kitáb-i-Mustaṭáb-i-Aqdas, a transcribed verse-by-verse analysis of the Kitáb-i-Aqdas in Persian. 
Táríkh-i-Amríy-i-Hamadán, a history of the Baháʼí Faith in the city of Hamadán.
Yádigár, transcribed oral remarks from Ishráq-Khávarí on various subjects.

See also
 Mírzá Abu'l-Faḍl (1844–1914)
 Mírzá Asadu'llah Fádil Mázandarání (1881–1957)
 Adib Taherzadeh (1921–2000)

References

Further reading
 Ṣáliḥ Mawlavínizhád, Ishráq-Khávarí: Zindigí, Áthár, va Kháṭirát (Madrid: Bunyád-i-Farhangíy-i-Niḥal, 2009). 
 Sulaymání, ʻAzízu'lláh, Maṣábíḥ-i-Hidáyat, vol. 9 (Tehran: Muʼassisiy-i-Millíy-i-Maṭbúʻát-i-Amrí, 1975), pp. 8–122; available online at the Afnán Library.

External links
 EŠRĀQ ḴĀVARĪ, ʿABD-AL-ḤAMĪD, Encyclopedia Iranica
 International Baháʼí Library: Collections - Ishráq-Khávari (archived, 2008)
 H-Bahai: ʻAbdu'l-Hamid Ishraq-Khavari – Collected Works in Arabic and Persian
 Mr. Ishraq Khavari: Books and Publications, by Adel Shafipour (2008)

1902 births
1972 deaths
Iranian Bahá'ís
Converts to the Bahá'í Faith from Shia Islam
20th-century Bahá'ís